The Norwegian Medical Association ( (1886–2008), spelled Den norske legeforening since 2008) is the main Norwegian medical association and trade union, and was founded in 1886. It has 32 555 members (as of 2016) or about 96% of all Norwegian doctors. Marit Hermansen is the current president of the association. It is affiliated with the Federation of Norwegian Professional Associations. The association publishes the Journal of the Norwegian Medical Association, established in 1881.

Governance:
Executive Committee (9 members)
County Divisions (19)
Occupational branches (7)
Specialty Branches (59)

References

External links 
Official website

Trade unions in Norway
Medical associations based in Norway
1886 establishments in Norway